Ganga Bani Shola is a Hindi action film of Bollywood directed by Kanti Shah, produced by P. L Ahuja and Yogesh Trivedi. This film was released on 3 July 1992 under the banner of Ambika Films.

Plot
This is a revenge story of a lady named Ganga who turned into dacoit. But incidentally her sister becomes a police officer.

Cast
 Anupam Kher
 Shakti Kapoor
 Dalip Tahil
 Kader Khan
 Kiran Kumar
 Vijay Saxena
 Goga Kapoor
 Joginder
 Firoz Irani
 Arun Mathur
 Jamuna
 Sripradha
 Nandita Thakur

Songs
"Hum Banjare Pyar Ke Maare" - Sadhana Sargam
"Ke Wadiya Bajana Balam Dheere Dheere" - Anupama Deshpande
"Mere Sajanwa" - Kavita Krishnamurthy
"Parody (Ganga Bani Shola)" - Sudesh Bhosle
"Sajna Maine Tum Ko Dil Diya" - Alka Yagnik

References

External links
 

1992 films
1990s Hindi-language films
Indian action films
Films scored by Dilip Sen-Sameer Sen
Indian rape and revenge films
Films about outlaws
Indian films about revenge
1992 action films
Hindi-language action films
Films directed by Kanti Shah